Myre refers to the following:

Places
Mire or quagmire, a geographical wetland or metaphorical equivalent
Myre, Andøy, a village in Andøy municipality, Nordland county, Norway
Myre, Øksnes, a village in Øksnes municipality, Nordland county, Norway
Myre Church, a church in Myre, Øksnes municipality, Nordland county, Norway
Myre-Big Island State Park, a state park in Minnesota, USA, just outside the city of Albert Lea

People
Greg Myre, American journalist who reported for The New York Times from Jerusalem
Odd Myre, Norwegian marketing agent
Phil Myre, retired Canadian professional ice hockey goaltender

See also
Mire (disambiguation)
Myhre (disambiguation)
Myra (disambiguation)